Česko Slovensko má talent (Czechia Slovakia's Got Talent or Czecho Slovakia's Got Talent) is a Czech-Slovak reality television series. It is televised talent show competition which started in August 2010 and originated from the Got Talent franchise. The show is a Thames production (formerly Talkback Thames) distributed by FremantleMedia and is produced in association with Syco TV.

The show is broadcast on two channels: Prima (Czech Republic) and TV JOJ (Slovakia). Anyone of any age with any sort of talent can audition for the show. Acts compete against each other to gain audience support while trying to become "the winner of Czecho Slovakia's Got Talent".

Presenters 
Key
 Presenter of Česko Slovensko má talent

Judging panel
Key
 Judging panel

Series overview

External links
Česko Slovensko má talent TV Joj
 Česko Slovensko má talent TV Prima

2010 Czech television series debuts
2010 Slovak television series debuts
Television series by Fremantle (company)
Got Talent
Czech reality television series
Slovak reality television series
Czech music television series
Slovak music television series
2010s Czech television series
2010s Slovak television series
Czech television series based on British television series
Slovak television series based on British television series
TV Nova (Czech TV channel) original programming
TV JOJ original programming